Alvesta is a locality and the seat of Alvesta Municipality in Kronoberg County, Sweden, with 8,017 inhabitants in the urban area in 2010.

Alvesta is an important railway junction, joining the Stockholm–Malmö–Copenhagen railway with the Gothenburg–Kalmar/Karlskrona railway.

References 

Municipal seats of Kronoberg County
Swedish municipal seats
Populated places in Kronoberg County
Populated places in Alvesta Municipality
Populated lakeshore places in Sweden
Värend

fi:Alvestan kunta